Dardhas is an administrative unit in the municipality of Pogradec, Korçë County, Albania. The village of Dardhas is the seat of the eponymous unit and consist of the adjacent villages of Derdushë, Grunjas, Lekas, Niçë, Osnat, Prenisht, Stërkanj and Stropckë.

References 

Administrative units of Pogradec
Villages in Korçë County
Former municipalities in Korçë County